Jorel Bellafonte (born 2 March 1995) is a Caymanian former track athlete, and current footballer who plays as a forward for Academy SC and the Cayman Islands national team.

Athletic career
Belafonte was a formerly a 800m and 1500m athlete, while at high school in Jamaica. He attended Calabar High School, where he won individual medals at the Inter-Secondary Schools Boys and Girls Championships in Jamaica, as well as team medals with his high school at the Penn Relays, winning the  relay in 2014. He then went on to become a Clemson Tiger at university, moving down to the 400mH. On the international stage, he represented the Cayman Islands at the CARIFTA Games on several occasions. He holds the national Caymanian indoor 800m record, with a time of 1:52.21 on a regular indoor track, and 1:51.82 on and oversized track (OT).

International football career
On 5 September 2019, Bellafonte made his debut against the US Virgin Islands in a 0–2 victory in the CONCACAF Nations League. On 8 September 2019, he scored his first goal for Cayman Islands against Barbados in a 3–2 victory.

Career statistics

International goals
Scores and results list the Cayman Islands' goal tally first.

References

1995 births
Living people
Association football forwards
Caymanian footballers
Roma United players
Cayman Islands Premier League players
Cayman Islands international footballers